Pope Paschal may refer to:
Pope Paschal I (817–824)
Pope Paschal II (1099–1118)
or antipopes:
Antipope Paschal (687) 
Antipope Paschal III (1164–1168)

Papal names